The following lists events that happened during 1978 in Singapore.

Incumbents
President: Benjamin Henry Sheares
Prime Minister: Lee Kuan Yew

Events

April
25 April – Police national serviceman Lee Kim Lai was murdered for his revolver by Ong Chin Hock, Yeo Ching Boon and Ong Hwee Kuan. En route to kidnapping him from his sentry post at Mount Vernon, they also killed the taxi driver, Chew Theng Hin.

October
12 October – The Spyros disaster occurred at Jurong Shipyard, resulting in 76 fatalities.

November
10–11 November – Floods occurred in Singapore, leaving 2 fatalities.
12–14 November – Then Senior Vice-Premier of the People's Republic of China Deng Xiaoping visits Singapore, setting the foundation for China–Singapore relations before being formally established on 3 October 1990.

December
6–10 December – Evangelist Billy Graham visits Singapore for a crusade.

Births
 23 July – Stefanie Sun, singer.
 24 September – Jean Danker, radio DJ.
 4 October – Amrin Amin, politician.
 3 November – Shaun Chen, actor.
 Desmond Choo – politician.

Deaths
 27 February – Tan Teck Neo, philanthropist and socialite (b. 1877).
 23 April – Teo Soon Kim, first woman admitted to the Straits Settlements bar (b. 1904).

References

 
Singapore
Years in Singapore